"Drown in My Own Tears" is a song by the American alternative rock group The Smithereens. It is the third single released in support of their second album Green Thoughts.

Background
Frontman Pat DiNizio came up with the guitar riff at the soundcheck for the last concert of the Especially for You tour. The title was taken from the song of the same name, best known in the version released as a single in 1956 by Ray Charles, and the lyrics were inspired by the Beatles' "No Reply".

Release
"Drown in My Own Tears" was released as the third single from the band's sophomore album, Green Thoughts. The single reached number 34 on the US Mainstream Rock Charts.

Formats and track listing 
All songs written by Pat DiNizio
US 7" single (B-44238)
"Drown in My Own Tears" – 3:09
"House We Used to Live In" – 4:00

Charts

References

External links 
 

1988 songs
1988 singles
Capitol Records singles
The Smithereens songs
Song recordings produced by Don Dixon (musician)
Songs written by Pat DiNizio